Calyptronoma is a genus in the  palm family, native to the Greater Antilles. They have pinnately compound leaves with short petioles.  The name was coined by August Grisebach who first described the genus in his 1846 Flora of the British West Indian Islands.

There are three species in the genus.
Calyptronoma occidentalis — endemic to Jamaica
Calyptronoma plumeriana — Cuba and Hispaniola
Calyptronoma rivalis — Hispaniola and Puerto Rico

References

 
 George Proctor. 2005. Arecaceae (Palmae).  Pp. 135–153 in Pedro Acevedo-Rodriguez and Mark T. Strong. Monocots and Gymnosperms of Puerto Rico and the Virgin Islands. Contributions from the United States National Herbarium Volume 52.

 
Arecaceae genera